The Remington Model 521 TL Junior is a member of the Remington 500 series rifles. It is bolt action with a walnut stock and a  barrel. It has a Lyman aperture rear sight that is adjustable for elevation and windage. The rifle takes a six-round magazine that fits flush with the bottom of the rifle.

References

Remington Arms firearms
Bolt-action rifles of the United States